Rockville is a South African soap opera created by married couple Connie and Shona Ferguson and produced by their production company, Ferguson Films. The series is written by Phathutshedzo Makwarela, Gwydion Beynon, Linda Bere, Chisanga Kabinga, Pamela Power and Sibusiso Mamba.

The show revolves around two different black families-the middle-class Bogatsus and the working-class Mabasos, who have are embroiled in an ongoing feud over a series of misunderstandings and hardships, particularly the one where the patriarch of the Bogatsu family, Jackson "JB" Bogatsu (Shona Ferguson) is secretly a pimp who corrupts innocent girls and make them prostitutes by using the attractive cigar lounge, Club Venus but when the Mabaso matriarch, Mavis' (Connie Ferguson) daughter, Lindi (Mbali Mlotshwa) gets a job as a waitress, JB pimps her into being a prostitute but it leads to an unrequited love that not only tears their families apart, but threaten to change the course of their lives forever as JB will have to confront enemies that threaten his business and family and Lindi and Mavis must face the hardships that threaten their family.

Rockville premiered on 19 June 2013 and is broadcast on Mzansi Magic on Sunday at its 8:00 PM timeslot. Each episode plays for 1-hour and the total of the each season is 10-hours. 
Rockville stars Connie Ferguson, Shona Ferguson, Terry Pheto and Mbali Mlotshwa as well as an ensemble cast which includes Boity Thulo, Brenda Ngxoli, Trevor Gumbi, Sello Sebotsane, Thembsie Matu, Shaleen Surtie-Richards.

Due to its success and reception, production began for the second season of Rockville. It premiered on 9 February 2014 with Clint Brink, Dorothy Ann Gould, Stephanie Schildknecht, Nandi Nyembe, Lerato Haji, Masego "Maps" Maponyane and Owen Sejake joining the ensemble cast.

Rockville was renewed for a third and fourth season which premiered on 4 January 2015. Notable casting changes occurred in the series with Bonnie Mbuli being replaced by Terry Pheto and Sipho Ngwenya's character being taken over by Fezile Makhanya.

In 2021, Mzansi Magic announced that their 20h00 Sunday slot was being taken over by Rockville again. They renewed the show for season five and Ferguson Films added Siyabonga Shibe and Thuli Phongolo to the cast.

Series overview

Season 1 

This season's main theme is the dark side of South Africa, the sacrifices, drama and subterfuge that it takes to get to the top in today's black South Africa.

It focused on two families-the middle-class Bogatsus and working-class Mabasos who have an ongoing feud over the misunderstandings and their different backgrounds as well as what their family members have done.

From the Mabasos, who live in the township Rockville in Soweto is the formidable matriarch, Mavis Mabaso (Connie Ferguson), whose family ends up in debt thanks to her son Oupa's (Lehasa Moloi) car crash that tests Mavis' strong will for her family and their struggling commitment but is helped by her loyal best friend, Rebecca (Thembsie Matu).

From the Bogatsus, who live in the upper class Waterfall suburb is the wealthy patriarch, Jackson "JB" Bogatsu (Shona Ferguson) who owns a high class cigar lounge known as Club Venus where all the wealthy come out to play. However, he really gets his wealthy from a secret high class escort service, where the prostitutes are known as Black Diamonds.

The central plot focuses on Mavis' daughter, Lindi (Mbali Mlothswa), who is a law student who dreams big and gets a job as a waitress at Club Venus, which JB uses to his advantage to pimp her but there becomes love at first sight, and it prompts Lindi into becoming a prostitute to help her family but it begins to set conflict between her family and JB's.

However, that's not all as an incident in the brothel puts JB's business at risk as the murky world if high class ends up coming out to play when Club Venus is about to be exposed for the lie that they are, which not only threatens JB's precious business that he worked hard to build but it also threatens to cause turmoil within his family as well as Lindi's family. Where she has to confront situations and make choices that she never dreamt of doing, Lindi realizes that every dream has a dark side.

Season 2 

As Rockville returns for a second season, the lives of the Mabasos and the Bogatsus have hit a knife edge. This is due to Mavis being the one who shot JB at his and Dudu's (Bonnie Mbuli) wedding anniversary and as JB is fighting for his life, Mavis is reeling after what she has done, while Oupa will do anything to protect his mother. This causes Mavis' daughter Lindi to leave and continue work as a prostitute.

After Mavis is released from jail, her moral values are again put to the test as she still regrets what she has done but seeks help from Paster Morake (Sello Sebotane) and Sis Rebecca, however when Lindi refuses to go back home, the arrival of Mavis' old friend, Gladys (Brenda Ngxoli) a divorcee drunkard leads Mavis to go astray with alcohol, threatening to tear apart her family and ruin her religious values.

Meanwhile, after JB is alive, he finds himself fighting for the control of Club Venus with the club's original founder. The ruthlessly diabolical Frankie who will do anything to beat JB while JB not only has to deal with some financial difficulties, but the arrival of his estranged father, gangster Cassius (Owen Sejake) possibly stirs trouble within JB's family. However, even though JB does not want anything to do with him, Cassius quickly commit a deadly salvation when he kills Frankie, leading JB to rule Club Venus again now that Frankie and Mike (Luthuli Dlamini) are dead. However, the fight for Club Venus and the brothel forces him to confront Frankie's vengeful son, Trevor (Clint Brink) who'll do anything to get what he wants and to rule his mother's business and will go so far as to even use JB's innocent daughter Mpho (Boity Thulo) as bait.

However, when Trevor is dead, JB is forced to confront his father which will not only lead to a destroyed bond but it also threatens to make him do something that will tear apart his family.

Season 3 

Rockville has been renewed for a third seasons which has been released on 4 January 2015, where this season's main theme focuses on the characters confronting their inner demons and the reckoning, not around their families, their friends but within themselves.

Season 4
The season follows up after the events of Jackson's shooting. He now live in Alex when his wife and children abandon him and leave him broke. He is also dumped by Lindi who give birth to a baby boy on the season premier. Vicky returns after her son is taken by her family and they organise a heist in order to reopen a strip club which proves to be a success but they also catch the attention of a corrupt politician Rolex Ngidi (Sello Maake Ka-Ncube).

Cast and Characters

External links 
http://mzansimagic.dstv.com/category/shows/rockville/
http://www.tvsa.co.za/showinfo.asp?showid=6827
http://www.drum.com/entertainment/mzansi-magic-release-teaser-for-rockville/
http://www.blog.indiewire.com/shadowandact/south-african-tv-drama-rockville-gets-summer-debut-date/

South African drama television series
2013 South African television series debuts